Renato Guttuso (26 December 1911 – 18 January 1987) was an Italian painter and politician. His best-known works include Flight from Etna (1938–39), Crucifixion (1941) and La Vucciria (1974). Guttuso also designed for the theatre (including sets and costumes for Histoire du Soldat, Rome, 1940) and did illustrations for books. Those for Elizabeth David’s Italian Food (1954), introduced him to many in the English-speaking world.  A fierce anti-Fascist, "he developed out of Expressionism and the harsh light of his native land to paint landscapes and social commentary."

Biography

Introduction 
He was born in Bagheria, near Palermo in Sicily, but from 1937 lived and worked largely in Rome. In his youth he joined the Gruppo universitario fascista, but later he became an anti-fascist and atheist. He joined the banned Italian Communist Party (PCI) in 1940 and left Rome to become an active participant in the partisan struggle from 1943. He was also an opponent to the Mafia. In 1972 Guttuso was awarded the Lenin Peace Prize. In 1976 he was elected to the Italian Senate as a PCI representative for the Sicilian constituency of Sciacca.

Childhood 
Renato Guttuso's father, Gioacchino Guttuso, was a land surveyor and amateur watercolourist. There are a number of portraits of Gioacchino in the collection donated to the mayor of Bagheria. Renato Guttuso began signing and dating his works at the age of thirteen. Guttuso lived close to a house amongst the Valguarnera villas and Palagonia, which he would soon represent in paintings inspired by the cliffs of Aspra.

In Palermo and in Bagheria Guttuso observed the dereliction of the 18th-century villas of the nobility, abandoned to decay as a consequence of political infighting within the municipal chambers. At the same time, his family suffered a period of economic stress because of the hostility shown by Fascists and clergy towards his father.

Guttuso went to Palermo for high school studies, and then to the University, where his development was modelled on the European figurative trends of the day, from Courbet to Van Gogh and to Picasso. In the early part of the 1930s, Guttuso was a frequent visitor to the studio of one of the most prolific futuristic painters, Pippo Rizzo. His works opened doors for him in Milan and to further travel throughout Europe.

As Guttuso's expressionism became stronger he painted more scenes of nature in flower, lemon trees, saracen olive trees, all in an environment suspended between myth and island insularity, so that, when sent to the  Quadriennale expo of 1931, he joined a collective of six Sicilian painters, acclaimed by the critic Franco Grasso as a "disclosure, a Sicilian affirmation". Back in Palermo Guttuso opened a studio in Pisani street and together with the painter Lia Pasqualino and the sculptors Barbera and Nino Franchina, formed the Gruppo dei Quattro (The Group of Four).

Rejection of the academic principles and social art 

Guttuso became a member of an artistic movement named "Corrente". The movement stood for free and open attitudes, in opposition to the official culture, and chose a strong anti-fascist position in thematic choices through the years of the Spanish Civil War.

In Milan, where he stayed for three years, Guttoso was part of  Corrente di Vita. Here he developed his "social" art, his moral and political commitment being visible in paintings such as Fucilazione in Campagna (1938), dedicated to the writer García Lorca, and Escape from Etna.

Moving to Rome, Guttuso opened a study in Via Margutta where, because of his exuberance, his friend Marino Mazzacurati nicknamed him "Unbridled". He lived close by to significant artists of the time: Mario Mafai, Corrado Cagli, Antonello Trombadori, keeping also in contact with the group from Milan of Giacomo Manzù and Aligi Sassu.

"Crocifissione" ("Crucifixion") is the painting for which he is best remembered. At the time it was derided by the clergy, who labelled Guttuso a "pictor diabolicus" ("a devilish painter"). The fascists also denounced it for depicting the horrors of war under a religious cover. Guttuso wrote in his diary: "it is the symbol of all those who endure insults, jail, torture for their ideas". Guttuso also spoke publicly about "The Crocifissione", saying  "this is a time of war. I wish to paint the torment of Christ as a contemporary scene... as a symbol of all those who, because of their ideas, endure outrage, imprisonment and torment".

He did not stop working during the years of World War II, his work ranging from landscape glimpses of the Gulf of Palermo to a collection of drawings entitled Massacri (Massacres), that clandestinely denounced slaughters such as the Fosse Ardeatine.
In 1945 Guttuso, along with artists Birolli, Marchiori, Vedova and others, founded the "Fronte Nuovo delle Arti' (New Arts Front) as a vessel for the promotion of the work of those artists who had previously been bound by fascist rule.  During this time, he also met and befriended Pablo Picasso. Their friendship would last until Picasso's death in 1973.  Socio-political themes dominated Guttuso's work during this area, depicting the day-to-day lives of peasants and blue-collar workers. In 1950, he was given the World Council of Peace Prize in Warsaw.  Guttuso later received the Lenin Piece Prize in 1972.

Later career
In 1938 Guttuso met Mimise Dotti, whom he married in 1956.  Poet Pablo Neruda was a witness at their wedding.  Mimise would become his confidant and model. After the liberation of Italy from Nazi Germans he finished "Muratori in riposo" ("Workers resting"), an artwork in china ink and watercolour of 1945, a symbol of rebirth of which Pier Paolo Pasolini wrote in 1962:

The shapes of ten workers
emerge white over white masonry
the noon is that of the summer.
But the humiliated flesh
projects a shadow; is the disarranged order
of the white colors, that is faithfully followed
by the black ones. The noon is a peaceful one.

In the following years Guttuso painted "Peasant Who Hoes" (1947) and "Peasants of Sicily" (1951) in which pictorial language became clear and free of all superfluous elements. Guttuso wrote that those were preparatory sketches for "Occupation of uncultivated lands of Sicily", exhibited in the Venice Biennale in 1950, asserting: 
I believe that these are legacies to my deeper and remote inspiration. To my childhood, to my people, my peasants, my father land-surveyor, the garden of lemons and oranges, to the gardens of the latitude familiar to my eye and my feeling, where I was born. Sicilian peasants who hold the primary position in my heart, because I am one of them, whose faces come in front of my eyes no matter what I do, Sicilian peasants so important in the history of Italy.

In 1950 Guttuso joined the project of the Verzocchi collection (in the civic Pinacoteca of Forlì), sending a self-portrait, and the works "Sicilian labourer", "Bagheria on the Gulf of Palermo" and "Battle of the Bridge of the Admiral". In the latter he depicted his grandfather Ciro as a Garibaldine soldier. Guttuso also painted a series from life about the fight of the peasants for the occupation of lands, the zolfatari, or glimpses of landscape between cactus and prickly pears, as well as portraits of men of culture like Nino Garajo and Bruno Caruso.

Fascinated by Dante's model, in 1961 he made a series of colour drawings, published in 1970, as Il Dante di Guttuso, depicting the characters of Hell as examples of human history, confirming the versatility of his talent. In the late 1960s and 1970s he completed a suite of paintings devoted to the feminine figure, a motif that became as dominant in his painting as it was in his life: "Donne stanze paesaggi, oggetti" (1967) was followed by a series of portraits of Marta Marzotto, his preferred muse of many years. His most famous "palermitano" painting is the "Vucciria" (the name of Palermo's market), in which, with raw and bloody realism, he expressed one of the many spirits of the Sicilian city.

Mimise Dotti-Guttuso died on 6 October 1986. Guttuso was soon to follow his  wife. He died in Rome of lung cancer at the age of 75 on 18 January 1987. On his deathbed, he allegedly embraced again the Christian faith with which he had been critical. However, there are doubts as to what really happened—in his last months, when he was bedridden, a circle of politicians and priests excluded his oldest friends from his villa. He donated many of his works to his hometown Bagheria, which are now housed in the museum of the Villa Cattolica.

After speculation about who would be the rightful owner of the painter's work, two prosecutors were appointed to settle the dispute between Guttuso's nephew, his adopted son (who had been adopted only four months before Guttuso's death, was 32 years old, and already had a natural father), his longtime lady friend Marta Marzotto, Rome's Museum of Modern Art, along with an assortment of other slighted acquaintances to high-ranking government and church officials.

References

External links

Renato Guttuso and the Language of his Painting   Review of a 2003/2004 exhibition.
Laboratorio arte e letteratura:Renato Guttuso  On a 2005 show relating Guttuso to Alberto Moravia, Elio Vittorini, and Pier Paolo Pasolini.
 Review of the exhibition Guttuso. Passione e realtà (Parma, 2010) 

1911 births
1987 deaths
People from Bagheria
20th-century Italian painters
20th-century male artists
Italian male painters
Italian watercolourists
Italian resistance movement members
Italian Communist Party politicians
Lenin Peace Prize recipients
Painters from Sicily
20th-century Italian politicians
Italian contemporary artists
Politicians from the Province of Palermo